Statistics of Czechoslovak First League in the 1933–34 season.

Overview
It was contested by 10 teams, and Slavia Prague won the championship. Raymond Braine and Jiří Sobotka were the league's top scorers with 18 goals each.

League standings

Results

Top goalscorers

References

Czechoslovakia - List of final tables (RSSSF)

Czechoslovak First League seasons
1933–34 in Czechoslovak football
Czech